

The Abbot of Glastonbury was the head (or abbot) of Anglo-Saxon and eventually Benedictine house of Glastonbury Abbey at Glastonbury in Somerset, England.

The following is a list of abbots of Glastonbury:

Abbots

See also
 Abbot's Kitchen, Glastonbury

Notes

Sources
 
 
 
 

Lists of abbots
History of Somerset
Abbot of Glastonbury
Abbot of Glastonbury